A Strange Place to Meet (also titled Strange Place for an Encounter) is a 1988 French drama film directed by François Dupeyron, and starring Catherine Deneuve and Gérard Depardieu.

Cast 
 Catherine Deneuve : France 
 Gérard Depardieu : Charles
 Nathalie Cardone : Sylvie
 André Wilms : Georges
 Jean-Pierre Sentier : Pierrot

References

External links
 IMDb entry
A Strange Place to Meet at Hollywood.com
A Strange Place to Meet - Movie - Review - New York Times
A Strange Place to Meet movie review - Film - Time Out London

1988 films
1988 romantic drama films
Films directed by François Dupeyron
1988 directorial debut films
French romantic drama films
Films scored by Nicola Piovani
1980s French films